Barmes is a surname. Notable people with the surname include:

Bruce Barmes (1929–2014), American baseball player
Clint Barmes (born 1979), American baseball player

See also
Barnes (name)